is a professional Japanese baseball player. He plays infielder for the Tokyo Yakult Swallows.

External links

 NPB.com

1995 births
Living people
Japanese baseball players
Nippon Professional Baseball infielders
Baseball people from Osaka Prefecture
Tokyo Yakult Swallows players